The Rose Tree is a poem by William Butler Yeats.  It was published in 1921 as part of his collection Michael Robartes and the Dancer.

It describes a fictional conversation between James Connolly and Padraig Pearse, the leaders of the 1916 Easter Rising. First, Pearse says that words and wind from across the sea (England) have withered the rose tree (Irish nationalism). Connolly replies that the tree only needs to be watered (that nationalism only needs to be tended to). Pearse then says that the wells are all dry, and that only their own blood "will make a right rose tree". Pearse and Connolly were both shot by firing squad after the Rising, thus "giving their blood".

External links
words of the poem and some commentary

Irish poems
Poetry by W. B. Yeats